Harold Hartney (5 September 1909 – 18 October 1963) was an  Australian rules footballer who played with Fitzroy in the Victorian Football League (VFL).

Notes

External links 
		

1909 births
1963 deaths
Australian rules footballers from Victoria (Australia)
Fitzroy Football Club players